Gheorghe Buruiană (1889 - 1933), a cooperator from Chişinăuon  March 27, 1918 voted the Union of Bessarabia with România. Some acts of March 27 have signed them together with Teodosie Bârcă as Vice-Presidents of the Moldovan Parliament.

Biography 
He served as Member of the Moldovan Parliament (1917–1918).

Gallery

Bibliography 
Gheorghe E. Cojocaru, Sfatul Țării: itinerar, Civitas, Chişinău, 1998, 
Mihai Taşcă, Sfatul Țării şi actualele autorităţi locale, "Timpul de dimineaţă", no. 114 (849), June 27, 2008 (page 16)

External links 
 Arhiva pentru Sfatul Tarii
 Deputaţii Sfatului Ţării şi Lavrenti Beria

Notes

1889 births
1933 deaths
Politicians from Chișinău
People from Kishinyovsky Uyezd
Deputy Presidents of the Moldovan Parliament
Moldovan MPs 1917–1918